Dean Henry Coney (born 18 September 1963) is an English former professional footballer who played as a forward for Fulham, Queens Park Rangers and Norwich City.

A cruciate ligament injury at Norwich ended his professional career, after which he played briefly in Hong Kong before playing non-league football back in England with Farnborough Town and Carshalton Athletic. He went on to manage Farnborough and was most recently assistant manager at Dagenham & Redbridge F.C.

Career
Coney began his career with Fulham, making his debut at the age of 17. He showed great promise and scored 19 goals in his first full season. He was capped by England under-21s. However, he was unable to maintain his early scoring rate and moved to QPR, who paid £200,000 for him in 1987. He failed to settle at Loftus Road, due partly to the fact that manager Trevor Francis often played him in midfield.

Towards the end of the 1988–89 season, Norwich manager Dave Stringer paid £350,000 for Coney. Norwich were enjoying an excellent season and were in with a chance of winning the first division championship. Stringer felt that Coney would score the extra goals that were needed, though Coney had failed to score in his 16 games that season for QPR. However, his time at Carrow Road was neither happy nor productive for Coney. He scored just one goal, which was a fortuitous one - in a league match against Aston Villa at Carrow Road on 22 April 1989 he charged down a clearance by Villa goalkeeper Nigel Spink and the ball rebounded off Coney's backside and into the goal. His performances became lacklustre and the supporters were very critical of Coney. The transfer fee was, at the time, one of the highest that Norwich had paid for a player, but little return on it was received. He was frequently heckled during matches and at length handed in a transfer request, stating "the fans have it in for me." Coney suffered his cruciate injury in a reserve match before he was able to find another club.

After a brief spell with Hong Kong team Ernest Borel he joined Farnborough where he eventually became player-manager. He moved to Carshalton where a serious knee injury ended his days as a player. He returned to Farnborough as temporary manager in 1999 and then first team coach. He was appointed assistant manager at Redbridge in 2005.

Sources
Canary Citizens by Mark Davage, John Eastwood, Kevin Platt, published by Jarrold Publishing, (2001),

External links

Career information at ex-canaries.co.uk

1963 births
Living people
English footballers
Footballers from Dagenham
Association football forwards
England under-21 international footballers
English Football League players
Norwich City F.C. players
Fulham F.C. players
Queens Park Rangers F.C. players
Sea Bee players
Farnborough F.C. players
Carshalton Athletic F.C. players